Isis, Queensland may refer to:

North Isis, Queensland, locality in the Bundaberg Region
South Isis, Queensland, locality in the Bundaberg Region
Shire of Isis, former local government area